Ystwyth may refer to:

 River Ystwyth, a river in West Wales, which drains into Cardigan Bay at Aberystwyth
 Ystwyth valley, a location in Wales drained by the River Ystwyth, known for its lead and silver mines and low life expectancy
 Cwm Ystwyth Lead Mine, a disused lead mine in the valley of the River Ystwyth
 Baron Ystwyth, an extinct title in the peerage of the United Kingdom
 Ysbyty Ystwyth, a village in Ceredigion, west Wales